Osornophryne antisana, the Napo plump toad, is a species of toad in the family Bufonidae.
It is endemic to Ecuador.
Its natural habitats are subtropical or tropical moist montane forests, subtropical or tropical high-altitude shrubland, and subtropical or tropical high-altitude grassland.
It is threatened by habitat loss.

References

Osornophryne
Amphibians of Ecuador
Amphibians of the Andes
Endemic fauna of Ecuador
Amphibians described in 1987
Taxonomy articles created by Polbot